This is the electoral history of Susan Collins, the senior United States senator from Maine since 1997. Previously, she was the 1994 Republican nominee for Governor of Maine.

Maine gubernatorial elections

1994

Maine senatorial elections

1996

2002

2008

2014

2020

References

Collins, Susan